Runkaus Strict Nature Reserve (Runkauksen luonnonpuisto) is in Lapland, Finland. This flat wetland and forest reserve has no trails as they would likely disappear during the next spring.

Strict nature reserves of Finland
Geography of Lapland (Finland)
Tervola